The men's high jump field event at the 1972 Olympic Games took place on September 9 & 10. Forty athletes from 26 nations competed. The maximum number of athletes per nation had been set at 3 since the 1930 Olympic Congress. The event was won by Jüri Tarmak of the Soviet Union; he was the last man to win an Olympic gold medal using the straddle technique. The more popular and more widely used Fosbury Flop technique was the most common technique used. 

Tarmak's win was the Soviet Union's third victory in the men's high jump. The Soviet Union reached the podium for the fifth consecutive time, while the United States did so for the 17th consecutive time with Dwight Stones's bronze. East Germany won its first men's high jump medal, in its first appearance, with Stefan Junge's silver. It was the first time since 1956 that an athlete from outside the United States and Soviet Union reached the podium.

Background

This was the 17th appearance of the event, which is one of 12 athletic events to have been held at every Summer Olympics. The returning finalists from the 1968 Games were eighth-place finisher Lawrie Peckham of Australia (also a 1964 finalist), ninth-place finisher Ingomar Sieghart of West Germany, and twelfth-place finisher Ahmed Senoussi of Chad. The top jumper of the previous year, world record holder and winner of the Pan American Games, was Pat Matzdorf from the United States. But in a surprise, he failed to make the US team, leaving the field wide open.

Cambodia, Cameroon, Iran, South Korea, Malawi, and Somalia each made their debut in the event; East Germany competed separately for the first time. The United States appeared for the 17th time, having competed at each edition of the Olympic men's high jump to that point.

Competition format

The competition used the two-round format introduced in 1912. There were two distinct rounds of jumping with results cleared between rounds. The qualifying round had the bar set at 1.80 metres, 1.90 metres, 2.00 metres, 2.06 metres, 2.09 metres, 2.12 metres, and 2.15 metres. All jumpers clearing 2.15 metres in the qualifying round advanced to the final. If fewer than 12 jumpers could achieve it, the top 12 (including ties) would advance to the final.

The final had jumps at 1.90 metres, 2.00 metres, 2.05 metres, 2.10 metres, 2.15 metres, 2.18 metres, 2.21 metres, and 2.23 metres.

Records

Prior to this competition, the existing world and Olympic records were as follows.

No new world or Olympic records were set during the competition.

Schedule

All times are Central European Time (UTC+1)

Results

Top 12 and ties and all jumpers clearing  advanced to the finals. All heights are listed in metres.

Qualifying

Final

References

External links
Official report

Men's high jump
High jump at the Olympics
Men's events at the 1972 Summer Olympics